Bonne Femme Creek is a stream in Howard and Randolph counties in the U.S. state of Missouri. It is a tributary of the Missouri River.

The stream flows to the southwest entering Howard County and flows past the east side of Fayette and on past New Franklin where it enters the Missouri River floodplain. It flows to the southeast passing under U.S. Route 40 and on to its confluence with the Missouri approximately two miles east of Booneville.

Bonne Femme Creek is a French name signifying "good woman".  The English and French names for the stream probably are accurate preservations of the Omaha language word for "good woman", i.e. the wife of their Indian religious leader.

See also
List of rivers of Missouri

References

Rivers of Howard County, Missouri
Rivers of Randolph County, Missouri
Rivers of Missouri